Nikoloz Basilashvili was the defending champion but chose not to defend his title.

Filip Krajinović won the title after defeating Norbert Gombos 6–3, 6–2 in the final.

Seeds

Draw

Finals

Top half

Bottom half

References
Main Draw
Qualifying Draw

Heilbronner Neckarcup - Singles
2017 Singles